Spoilers with Kevin Smith is a film review talk show that premiered June 4, 2012 on Hulu. The show, described as an "anti-movie review" show, is hosted by Kevin Smith and produced by Smith's SModcast Pictures. A second season of Spoilers aired on The Comedy Network in Canada. Ten new half-hour episodes were shot in Los Angeles. The first series was filmed at "SModCo Studios", the upper floor of The Jon Lovitz Podcast Theatre at CityWalk in Universal Studios Hollywood. The second series was filmed at Raleigh Studios.

Format

The Spoilers' Anti-Review
Each week, Smith takes a group of approximately forty people of varying ages (a.k.a. "the Spoilers") to see the release of a new movie. The Spoilers return to the "Jay & Silent Bob-atorium" in the studio to comment on the film, good or bad. This is the "anti-review" part of the show, as no true consensus is reached on the film in question; it is simply the opinions of the group of attendees, with a few comments and a brief summary thrown in by Smith. At the end of the show, Smith suggests that the viewer not necessarily listen to the opinions put forward by the Spoilers and encourages viewers to go and see the movie themselves and form their own opinions, further pressing the "anti-review" angle of the segment.

"Criterion Lounge"
Smith relates his opinions on a selected Criterion Collection film available on DVD and as part of the Hulu Plus service. This segment was not featured in season 2.

Celebrity interview
Smith has an informal interview with the week's scheduled guest; the guest sits in a specially constructed throne adorned with griffins whose faces resemble Jason Mewes and Smith as Jay and Silent Bob. Smith stands to the side of the throne and conducts the interview.

"Spoilers Cartoon Laboratory"
Similar to the "SModCo Cartoon Show" on the SModcast website and Smith's "S.I.T." (SModCo Internet Television) YouTube channel, an animated short is aired using the soundtrack of an episode of Hollywood Babble-On as its voice track. The segment is co-hosted by "Professor Cartoonius", played by Smith's Hollywood Babble-On co-host Ralph Garman (in wig, glasses and fake mustache, doing his impression of Ed Wynn). This segment  was not featured in season 2.

"Mewes Tube"
Jason Mewes shows reviews of movies that have been sent to him on YouTube. This segment started in season 2.

Episodes

Season 1 (2012)

''* NOTE: Due to the events of the 2012 Aurora, Colorado shooting, discussion of the events of that tragedy took precedence over discussion of the movie, and none of the other normal segments were used in this episode.

Season 2 (2013)

References

External links
 
 
 Spoilers page on Comedy Canada

2010s American television talk shows
2012 American television series debuts
2014 American television series endings
Hulu original programming
Television series by SModcast Pictures
Kevin Smith